Earth Alliance may refer to: 

 Earth Alliance (Babylon 5), from the Babylon 5 TV series
 Earth Alliance (Gundam), from the Mobile Suit Gundam SEED anime series
 Earth Alliance (The History of the Galaxy), from The History of the Galaxy series of novels